Dr Deqo Aden Mohamed is a Somalia-born obstetrician-gynecologist who is former CEO of the Dr Hawa Abdi Foundation, Founder Hagarla Institute. The operations of the foundation is based in Hope Village, a complex in Mogadishu, Somalia, providing healthcare, education and shelter to thousands of displaced people. The village was founded by Mohamed's mother Dr Hawa Abdi and is run alongside her sister, Dr Amina Mohamed. In addition to her executive role, Deqo Mohamed works as a doctor in the Dr Hawa Abdi General Hospital.

Early life and education 
Mohamed was born in Mogadishu, Somalia  to Dr Hawa Abdi and Aden Mohamed. She went to college and medical school in Russia, helping her mother in the camp in between studying. Mohamed was chosen as a Yale Maurice R. Greenberg World Fellow in 2016.

Career 
After her studies, Mohamed immigrated to the US as a refugee in 2003. During this time she worked in multiple labs and was granted US citizenship in 2008. In 2010 she gave a TEDtalk alongside her mother Dr Hawa Abdi about their medical clinic. She returned to Somalia in 2011, feeling a sense of responsibility to help the situation in the country. She was chosen as a mentee for the Bank of America Global Ambassadors Program in 2014.

Mohamed is currently CEO of the Dr Hawa Abdi Foundation in the US and works on the ground at Hope Village. The foundation aims "to create access to basic human rights in Somalia through building sustainable institutions in healthcare, education, agriculture, and social entrepreneurship". Hope Village consists of a hospital, a primary school, a high school, a women's education centre, agricultural projects, a sanitation program and a refuge for families. Mohamed is also a visiting lecturer at the African Leadership University School of Business, Rwanda.

Awards and honours 

BET Social Humanitarian Award (2012) - awarded to Dr Hawa Abdi, Dr Amina Mohamed and Dr Deqo Mohamed
Glamour Women of the Year (2010) - awarded to Dr Hawa Abdi, Dr Amina Mohamed and Dr Deqo Mohamed
Chatham University Commencement Speaker (2017)

Personal life 
Mohamed married her husband, a physician, in 2012. Her father died in 2012 and her mother died in 2020.

References 

Year of birth missing (living people)
Living people
Somalian obstetricians and gynaecologists